Villingili (Dhivehi: ވިރިންގިލި), is an uninhabited islet in Lakshadweep, India. It is located at the southwestern end of Minicoy's reef, in Maliku Atoll.

History
It is the location where the lepers of Lakshadweep were banished, where they lived in abject conditions

Administration
The island belongs to the township of Minicoy of Minicoy Tehsil.

Geography
Viringili is barely 200 m in length. It is fringed with gravel and it is covered with bushes. A few stunted coconut trees grow in the center of the island.

Image gallery

References

 Bell, H.C.P.: The Maldive Islands, An account of the physical features, History, Inhabitants, Productions and Trade. Colombo 1883.
 Xavier Romero-Frias, The Maldive Islanders, A Study of the Popular Culture of an Ancient Ocean Kingdom. Barcelona 1999,

External links

 

Islands of Lakshadweep
Landforms of Lakshadweep
Underwater diving sites in India
Uninhabited islands of India
Leper colonies
Islands of India